Marshall State Fish and Wildlife Area is an Illinois state park on  in Marshall County, Illinois, United States.

References

State parks of Illinois
Protected areas of Marshall County, Illinois
Protected areas established in 1925
1925 establishments in Illinois